KBS Media Ltd. is a South Korea-based television production company. It is a subsidiary of the Korean Broadcasting System.

List of Works

As production company

References

External links
  

South Korean companies established in 1991
Television production companies of South Korea
Companies based in Seoul
Korean Broadcasting System subsidiaries
Mass media companies established in 1991